A penumbral lunar eclipse will take place on May 17, 2049.

Visibility

Related lunar eclipses

Lunar year series

Saros series

Half-Saros cycle
A lunar eclipse will be preceded and followed by solar eclipses by 9 years and 5.5 days (a half saros). This lunar eclipse is related to two partial solar eclipses of Solar Saros 119.

See also 
List of lunar eclipses and List of 21st-century lunar eclipses

Notes

External links 
 

2049-05
2049-05
2049 in science